Quail Dobbs (27 August 1941 in Albany, Texas – 15 January 2014 in Coahoma, Texas) was a famous rodeo clown and performer, inducted into the ProRodeo Hall of Fame in 2002.

His parents were Acie and Avis Dobbs, and his childhood was marked by many moves. In the late 1950s, the family moved to Colorado City. In 1964, Dobbs married a high school classmate named Judy, and the couple had two children, Stephanie and Coley. In 1972, he made his acting debut as a rodeo clown in the movie J. W. Coop.

Dobbs began his career in rodeo by riding bulls and bareback horses, and in 1962 began work as a barrelman. During his career he performed on the Professional Rodeo Cowboys Association (PRCA). He was named PRCA Clown of the Year twice in 1978 and 1988 and the Coors Man in the Can four times in 1985, 1986, 1990 and 1993. He was one of only three men to work as both a bullfighter and barrelman at the National Finals Rodeo, and also worked seven times as a barrelman for the Wrangler Bullfight Tours Final. He also worked 28 times at the Cheyenne Frontier Days in Wyoming, and the 1998 Frontier Days marked Dobbs' last appearance in professional rodeo. After his retirement, he became justice of the peace in Coahoma, Texas a position he held until his passing in 2014.

Honors 
 2002 Pro Rodeo Hall of Fame
 2002 Texas Rodeo Cowboy Hall of Fame
 2003 Texas Cowboy Hall of Fame
 2003 Cheyenne Frontier Days Hall of Fame
 2004 Texas Rodeo Hall of Fame
 2011 Texas Trail of Fame
 2021 Bull Riding Hall of Fame

References

External links
 No Clowning in This Court, Quail Dobbs in American Profile magazine

American male equestrians
American clowns
People from Albany, Texas
Rodeo clowns
1941 births
2014 deaths
ProRodeo Hall of Fame inductees